Bob Wood (born March 11, 1940) is a Canadian former politician. Wood represented the riding of Nipissing in the House of Commons of Canada from 1988 to 2004 as a member of the Liberal Party. Wood did not stand for re-election in the 2004 election.

Wood was born in Ayer's Cliff, Quebec. Prior to entering politics, he was a radio broadcaster in North Bay, Ontario.

External links
 

1940 births
Living people
Liberal Party of Canada MPs
Members of the House of Commons of Canada from Ontario
People from North Bay, Ontario
People from Estrie
Anglophone Quebec people
21st-century Canadian politicians